The football tournament at the 1979 Spartakiad of Peoples of the USSR was a preparatory competition for the Soviet Union Olympic football team for the upcoming 1980 Summer Olympics. The competition took place on July 20 through August 5, 1979 as part of the Spartakiad of Peoples of the USSR.

Out of all the union republics, the Estonian SSR was not participating, while Russia was represented with 3 teams: Moscow City, Leningrad City and Russian Federation.

Competition

Qualification groups
All times local (UTC+3)

Group 1 (Moscow)
CSKA Stadium, Lokomotiv Stadium
{| class=wikitable style="text-align:center"
|-
!width="165"|Team
!width="20"|
!width="20"|
!width="20"|
!width="20"|
!width="20"|
!width="20"|
!width="20"|
!width="20"|
|- style="background:#cfc"
|align=left| Moskva
|3||3||0||0||10||2||+8||6
|- style="background:#cfc"
|align=left| Kazakhstan
|3||2||0||1||3||4||-1||2
|- style="background:#fcc"
|align=left| Moldavia
|3||1||0||2||4||8||-4||2
|- style="background:#fcc"
|align=left| Turkmenia
|3||0||0||3||2||5||-3||0
|}

Group 2 (Moscow)
Torpedo Stadium
{| class=wikitable style="text-align:center"
|-
!width="165"|Team
!width="20"|
!width="20"|
!width="20"|
!width="20"|
!width="20"|
!width="20"|
!width="20"|
!width="20"|
|- style="background:#cfc"
|align=left| Georgia
|3||2||1||0||8||0||+8||5
|- style="background:#cfc"
|align=left| Litva
|3||1||1||1||1||5||-4||3
|- style="background:#fcc"
|align=left| Azerbaijan
|3||1||1||1||1||1||-0||3
|- style="background:#fcc"
|align=left| Kirgizia
|3||0||1||2||0||4||-4||1
|}

Group 3 (Kiev)
 Dynamo Stadium
{| class=wikitable style="text-align:center"
|-
!width="165"|Team
!width="20"|
!width="20"|
!width="20"|
!width="20"|
!width="20"|
!width="20"|
!width="20"|
!width="20"|
|- style="background:#cfc"
|align=left| Ukraina
|4||3||0||0||10||3||+7||6
|- style="background:#cfc"
|align=left| RSFSR
|4||2||0||1||4||6||-2||4
|- style="background:#fcc"
|align=left| Uzbekistan
|4||1||0||2||4||4||−0||2
|- style="background:#fcc"
|align=left| Tajikistan
|4||0||0||3||1||6||-5||0
|}

Group 4 (Minsk)
 Traktor Stadium
{| class=wikitable style="text-align:center"
|-
!width="165"|Team
!width="20"|
!width="20"|
!width="20"|
!width="20"|
!width="20"|
!width="20"|
!width="20"|
!width="20"|
|- style="background:#cfc"
|align=left| Leningrad
|3||3||0||0||13||4||+9||6
|- style="background:#cfc"
|align=left| Belarusia
|3||2||0||1||7||4||+3||4
|- style="background:#fcc"
|align=left| Latvia
|3||1||0||2||7||10||-3||2
|- style="background:#fcc"
|align=left| Armenia
|3||0||0||3||1||10||-9||0
|}

Consolation tournament
For 9-12 places (Kiev)
{| class=wikitable style="text-align:center"
|-
!width="165"|Team
!width="20"|
!width="20"|
!width="20"|
!width="20"|
!width="20"|
!width="20"|
!width="20"|
!width="20"|
|- style="background:#cfc"
|align=left| Uzbekistan
|3||2||1||0||7||4||+3||5
|- 
|align=left| Azerbaijan
|3||2||0||1||6||6||+0||4
|- 
|align=left| Moldavia
|3||1||1||1||4||4||-0||3
|- 
|align=left| Latvia
|3||0||0||3||3||6||-3||0
|}

For 13-16 places (Minsk)
{| class=wikitable style="text-align:center"
|-
!width="165"|Team
!width="20"|
!width="20"|
!width="20"|
!width="20"|
!width="20"|
!width="20"|
!width="20"|
!width="20"|
|- style="background:#cfc"
|align=left| Tajikistan
|3||2||1||0||12||3||+9||5
|- 
|align=left| Armenia
|3||2||1||0||6||3||+3||5
|- 
|align=left| Kirgizia
|3||0||1||2||4||6||−2||1
|- 
|align=left| Turkmenia
|3||0||1||2||2||12||-10||1
|}

Semifinals groups
Group A (Moscow)
{| class=wikitable style="text-align:center"
|-
!width="165"|Team
!width="20"|
!width="20"|
!width="20"|
!width="20"|
!width="20"|
!width="20"|
!width="20"|
!width="20"|
|- style="background:#cfc"
|align=left| Moskva
|3||2||1||0||4||0||+4||5
|- 
|align=left| Ukraina
|3||1||1||1||2||2||+0||3
|- 
|align=left| Litva
|3||1||0||2||2||4||-2||2
|- 
|align=left| Belorusia
|3||0||2||1||0||2||-2||2
|}

Group B (Moscow)
{| class=wikitable style="text-align:center"
|-
!width="165"|Team
!width="20"|
!width="20"|
!width="20"|
!width="20"|
!width="20"|
!width="20"|
!width="20"|
!width="20"|
|- style="background:#cfc"
|align=left| Georgia
|3||2||1||0||8||5||+3||5
|- 
|align=left| RSFSR
|3||2||1||0||7||1||+6||5
|- 
|align=left| Leningrad
|3||1||0||2||5||7||−2||2
|- 
|align=left| Kazakhstan
|3||0||0||3||3||10||-7||0
|}

Final playoffs (Moscow)
 7th place playoff. Kazakhstan – Belorusia 1:0
 5th place playoff. Leningrad – Litva 2:1
 3rd place playoff. Ukraina – RSFSR 2:1
 1st place playoff. Moskva – Gruzia 2:1

Squads composition

Moldavian SSR
Head coach: Vyacheslav Kirichenko, assistant: Vladimir Gosperskiy

Whole squad was based on the senior team of FC Nistru Kishinev.

Kazakh SSR
Head coach: Igor Volchok, assistant: Leonid Ostroushko

Whole squad was based on the senior team of FC Kairat Alma-Ata.

Turkmen SSR
Head coach: Valery Nepomnyashchy, assistant: Viktor Savenkov

Whole squad was based on the senior team of FC Kolkhozchi Ashkhabad.

Moscow
Head coach: Konstantin Beskov, assistant: Nikolai Starostin

Kyrgyz SSR
Head coach: Rivgat Bibayev, assistant: Anatoliy Kolmykov

Whole squad was based on the senior team of FC Alga Frunze.

Azerbaijan SSR
Head coach: Ahmad Alasgarov, assistant: Vladimir Shuvalov

Whole squad was based on the senior team of FC Neftchi Baku.

Georgian SSR
Head coach: Nodar Akhalkatsi, assistant: Kakhi Asatiani

Whole squad was based on the senior team of FC Dinamo Tbilisi.

Lithuanian SSR
Head coach: Benjaminas Zelkevičius, assistant: Stanislovas Ramjalis

Except for one player (see the roster), whole squad was based on the senior team of FC Žalgiris Vilnius.

Russian SFSR
Head coach: Vladimir Ivashkov, assistant: Nikolai Samarin

Uzbek SSR
Head coach: Oleh Bazylevych, assistant: Idgai Tazetdinov

Whole squad was based on the senior team of FC Pakhtakor Tashkent.

Ukrainian SSR
Head coach: Valeriy Lobanovskyi, assistant: Volodymyr Bohdanovych

Tajik SSR
Head coach: Mark Tunis, assistant: Sharif Nazarov

Whole squad was based on the senior team of FC Pamir Dushanbe.

Belorussian SSR
Head coach: Eduard Malofeyev, assistant: Leonid Harai

Whole squad was based on the senior team of FC Dinamo Minsk.

Latvian SSR
Head coach: Gennadi Bondarenko, assistant: Boris Reingold

Armenian SSR
Head coach: Yozhef Betsa, assistant: Grachik Khachmanukyan

Whole squad was based on the senior team of FC Ararat Yerevan.

Leningrad
Head coach: Yury Morozov, assistant: Vadim Kharovitskiy

Further reading
 Футбол-80: Справочник-календарь. / Сост. Н. Я. Киселёв — Л.: Lenizdat, 1980.
 Московский футбол. XX век. — М.: ВЛАДМО, 2000. — 
 «Футбол-Хоккей», № 29, 22 августа 1979.

External links
 Sarsekov, S. ''Spartakiad-79 – higher are only stars (Спартакиада-79 – Выше только звёзды). Football Federation of Astana. 19 May 2016.
 1979 season at FootballFacts.ru
 Футбольный турнир VII Летней Спартакиады народов СССР. Составы команд. Squads composition. Luhansk Our Football.
 Повторение пройденного (Летопись Акселя Вартаняна. 1979 год. Часть шестая.) www.sport-express.ru

1979
Spartakiad of Peoples of the USSR